Carl Williams (August 24, 1930 – February 24, 1973) was an American racecar driver.

Born in Grandview, Missouri, Williams was killed in a motorcycle accident in Kansas City. He drove in the USAC Championship Car series, racing in the 1965–1972 seasons, with 63 career starts, including the Indianapolis 500 in 1966–1970 and 1972. He finished in the top ten 21 times, with his best finish in 2nd position in 1970 at Springfield.

Indianapolis 500 results

References

1930 births
1973 deaths
Indianapolis 500 drivers
Motorcycle road incident deaths
People from Grandview, Missouri
Racing drivers from Kansas City, Missouri
Racing drivers from Missouri
Road incident deaths in Missouri

McLaren Racing drivers